Naam Moovar is a 1966 Indian Tamil-language comedy drama film, directed by Jambulingam. The film's story was written by Mahendran and dialogue by Mullai Sakthi respectively. It stars Jaishankar, Ravichandran and Nagesh playing major roles, with L. Vijayalakshmi, Rathna, V. K. Ramasamy and Pandari Bai playing pivotal roles. The film was released on 5 August 1966, and was a huge success at the box-office.

Plot

Cast 
 Jaishankar
 Ravichandran
 Nagesh
 V. K. Ramasamy
 L. Vijayalakshmi
 Rathna
 Pandari Bai
 Madhavi
 Sarojini
 Mala
 Thangavelu
 Rajamani
 Kumar
 Jo
 Ramani

Production 
Naam Moovar was the first film for which Mahendran wrote the story. K. R. Balan, who was a friend of M. G. Ramachandran, decided to produce a film after being impressed by the script of Mahendran with P. Madhavan as director. However four days after the shoot, Madhavan left the film as he could not handle such a different plot and Mahendran left the sets and went to his village without informing anyone. Few days later, Balan wrote a letter to him inviting him to Madras, he insisted Mahendran to add more commercial elements to the script and made the editor Jambulingam to direct the film to which Mahendran agreed.

Soundtrack 
Music was by S. M. Subbaiah Naidu and lyrics were written by Vaali. The song "Pirantha Naal Indru" became hugely popular and was often played in birthday shows in Ceylon Radio.

Release and reception 
Naam Moovar was released on 5 August 1966. Kalki gave the film a mixed review, but appreciated the performance of Nagesh, Ravichandran and Jaishankar. The film became successful at box-office.

References

Bibliography

External links 
 

1960s Tamil-language films
1966 comedy-drama films
1966 films
Films scored by S. M. Subbaiah Naidu
Films with screenplays by Mahendran (filmmaker)
Indian black-and-white films
Indian comedy-drama films